Congo River Rapids is a river rapids ride made by Intamin. It is located in the Katanga Canyon area of Alton Towers in Staffordshire, England.

The rapids comes close to the Runaway Mine Train as it passes through the tunnel. It featured twin waterfalls, and rafts passed between the two waterfalls. 

Congo River Rapids shares its name with a ride at Busch Gardens Tampa in Tampa, Florida, but it has different layout.

History

Congo River Rapids first opened in 1989 as Grand Canyon Rapids and was part of the Aqua Land area of the park.

The entrance to the queueline was originally located where the path to Katanga Canyon starts in Mutiny Bay today, meaning that the ride was hidden from view. This was changed when Katanga Canyon was built in the centre of the rapids circuit as part of John Wardley's plan to open up the area. Katanga Canyon opened in 1992 along with the new Runaway Mine Train.

The Grand Canyon Rapids were rethemed to adopt the African safari theme of the new area, including the change of name to Congo River Rapids.

The original rafts held six riders. These were changed years later for eight seat rafts to increase passenger throughput.

The ride would close for safety on May 17, 2017, when it was announced that the Swiss company Intamin were the makers of the similar ride, Splash Canyon, involved in an incident where an eleven year-old child fell from a raft into the waters and died.

On 22 January 2018, Alton Towers announced that the ride would operate seasonally for 2018, operating only from 26 May to 4 September, but the ride operated throughout the season after a negative social media response. Some key features of the ride that were designed to get riders wet such as the waterfalls were temporarily isolated. The ride did not operate during the 2018, nor the 2019, Services Day events.

For the 2019 season, the boats were modified to have gates in the inter-seat gaps where boarding and disembarking occurs, grip matts have been added on the floors and seats, boats can only contain a maximum of 7 riders each (a reduction from 8) and during the school trip season children may no longer ride alone, even if they are able to meet the 1.3M height restriction for unaccompanied guests - at least one adult must be in each boat.

The ride can run with up to a maximum  of 31 of the 35 boats available at any given time but now usually runs with around 25.

Operation
The ride's energy requirements are considerable, with its large pumps requiring 15 minutes to bring water volume to the required level for operation. It features its own electrical substation and 1.3 million gallon water reservoir. The ride has 4 pumps available for use with three being used at any given time and one as a back up.

The rapids effect of the water is largely achieved by the placement of wooden blocks secured to the bottom of the ride's concrete channel. When water flow is activated via its pumps, turbulence is seen at the wooden blocks as the water flows over. There are also three "Wavemaker" machines placed at strategic points around the ride however these are now isolated due to safety concerns.

Inspiration
The inspiration for this ride comes from the real Congo River rapids. They lie on the outskirts of Brazzaville in the Republic of the Congo, where the Djoué River meets the Congo.

Gallery

References

External links

Congo River Rapids at Towers Almanac
Congo River Rapids at Towers Nerd
Congo River Rapids at Theme Parks UK

Water rides
Amusement rides introduced in 1986
Alton Towers